Pocomoke Sound Wildlife Management Area is a Wildlife Management Area in Somerset County, Maryland.

External links
Pocomoke Sound Wildlife Management Area

Wildlife management areas of Maryland
Protected areas of Somerset County, Maryland